De blå ulvene is a 1993 Norwegian crime film directed by Morten Kolstad, starring Håvard Bakke, Tommy Karlsen and Viggo Jønsberg.

Synopsis
Pelle's (Bakke) father (Jønsberg) is behaving strangely, and together with Proffen (Karlsen), Pelle decides to investigate.

External links
 

1993 films
1990s crime films
Norwegian crime films